The Beggar Bride was a 1997 British two-part television programme adapted from the Gillian White novel of the same name.

Overview

It was released on VHS in 1999 by 2 Entertain Video.

Cast and crew

Cast
Keeley Hawes as Angela Harper
Nicholas Jones as Sir Fabian Ormerod
Joe Duttine as Billy Harper
Kacey Ainsworth as Tina
Jessica and Stephanie Foulger as the babies
Jean Anderson as Lady Alice Hurleston
Angela Belton as WDC Jones
T. R. Bowen as Jerry (as Trevor Bowen)
John Bowler as Inspector Hayes
Elena Byers as Pandora Ormerod
Joanna Byers as Tabitha Ormerod
Constance Chapman as Nanny Ba Ba
Maurice Denham as Lord Evelyn Hurleston
Iain Easton as Robert
Ian Easton as Robert (the chauffeur)
Francesca Folan as Ruth Hubbard
Miles Harvey as Aaron Teale
Diana Kent as Ffiona Ormerod
Richard Lintern as	Callister
Lizzie Mickery as Sandra Baines
Georgina Sutcliffe as Laura
Charlotte Williams as Honesty Ormerod
Nicholas Pepworth as the wedding photographer
Jessica Smith as Harry #2

Crew
Director: Diarmuid Lawrence
Producer: Kate Harwood
Executive Producer: Michael Wearing
Script: Lizzie Mickery and Gillian White (novel)

Music

"She's a Star" by James.
"You've Got a Lot to Answer For" by Catatonia.

External links
Interview with Keeley Hawes on her website
 

1997 British television series debuts
1997 British television series endings
1990s British drama television series
1990s British television miniseries
BBC television dramas
English-language television shows
1997 television films
1997 films